KKBJ (1360 kHz), known as "Talkradio 106.3 & 1360", is an AM radio station based in Bemidji, Minnesota, that airs a talk format. It is owned by RP Broadcasting. The programming is a mixture of local and syndicated talk shows.

Along with the station's normally scheduled programs, "Talkradio 1360" also plays the Bemidji State University Women's Hockey and Basketball and Nationwide Series Racing shows. They also play church services from local churches on the radio every Sunday morning.

External links
Talkradio 1360

Talk radio stations in the United States
Radio stations in Minnesota
Radio stations established in 1987